DSCC can mean:
Deep Space Communications Complex (disambiguation), various places
Deep Sea Conservation Coalition
Democratic Senatorial Campaign Committee
Defense Supply Center, Columbus
Dyersburg State Community College
Designation and Sentence Computation Center
Dhaka South City Corporation